This is a list of notable footballers who have played for Chesterfield.

The aim is for this list to include all players that have played 100 or more Football League matches for the club, as taken from a list provided via the club's website.

For a list of all Chesterfield players with a Wikipedia article, see :Category:Chesterfield F.C. players, and for the current squad see Chesterfield F.C.#Current squad.

Explanation of list
Players should be listed in chronological order according to the year in which they first played a Football League match for the club, and then by alphabetical order of their surname. Appearances and goals should include substitute appearances, but exclude wartime matches.

Total appearances
The figures for total appearances and goals should include the League figures together with ideally the following competitions:
 Play-off matches (1989–90, 1994–95)
 FA Cup
 Football League Cup; Football League Trophy; Football League Third Division North Cup (1933–34 to 1935–36)
 Anglo-Scottish Cup (1980–81), Football League Group Cup/Trophy (1981–82, 1982–83)

List of players
Statistics are up to date as of 29 August 2012.

References

External links
 List of Chesterfield debutants by date - official site 
 Post-war Football League Player statistics
 Soccerbase stats (use Search for...on left menu and select 'Players' drop down)
 
 cfchistory.com – Chesterfield FC: Player-based information

Players
 
Chesterfield
Association football player non-biographical articles